The Health District, also known as the Civic Center, is a neighborhood in the city of Miami, Florida. The Health District is bound roughly by Northwest 20th Street and 14th Avenue to the northwest, the Dolphin Expressway and the Miami River to the south and west, and the Midtown Interchange and I-95 to the east.

The Health District has the country's largest concentration of medical and research facilities after Houston. The neighborhood is composed primarily of hospitals, research institutes, clinics and government offices, and is the center of Miami's growing biotechnology and medical research industry. It is the home of the University of Miami Leonard M. Miller School of Medicine and the University of Miami's Life Science and Technology Park. The Health District is approximately five minutes north of downtown Miami via rapid transit on the Miami Metrorail.

History

The neighborhood has its roots as a health district with the opening of Jackson Memorial Hospital in 1915, with some of the original buildings, such as The Alamo still standing. Today, the Alamo serves an era museum of Jackson's history throughout the years. Jackson Memorial Hospital is the major public hospital of Miami, and Jackson's hospital in the Health District is the health system's primary hospital.

Hospitals and research institutes
The Health District is the center of Miami's medical, research and biotechnology industries, and as such is home to many of the city's largest hospital systems. The largest is the public hospital, Jackson Memorial Hospital, which also has two branch hospitals in northern and southern Miami-Dade County. Jackson has affiliations as teaching hospitals with the University of Miami's Miller School of Medicine since 1952 and more recently with Florida International University's Herbert Wertheim College of Medicine. Other hospitals include: Miami VA Medical Center, University of Miami Hospital (formerly Cedars Medical Center), and Holtz Children's Hospital.

Some of the research institutes in the Health District are:
Bascom Palmer Eye Institute
University of Miami Cytogenetic Lab
University of Miami's Leonard M. Miller School of Medicine
Miami Dade College Medical Campus
Batchelor Children's Research Institute
Braman Family Breast Cancer Institute
Center on Aging
Diabetes Research Institute
John T MacDonald Foundation Department of Human Genetics
Florida International University Wertheim College of Medicine
Gordon Center for Research in Medical Education
University of Miami Interdisciplinary Stem Cell Institute
Mailman Center for Child Development
Miami Institute for Human Genomics
Miami Project to Cure Paralysis
Sylvester Comprehensive Cancer Center
Vascular Biology Institute
William Lehman Injury Research Institute

Transportation
Civic Center is served by Metrobus throughout the area, and by the Miami Metrorail at:

  Civic Center station (NW 15th Street and 12th Avenue)
  Santa Clara station (NW 20th Street and 12th Avenue)

The Health District is served by Civic Center station, a station of the Metrorail rapid transit system. It connects directly to all the major hospitals and research centers, and connects the district to Downtown Miami, Dadeland, and Hialeah, as well as to Miami's commuter rail system, Tri-Rail. In March 2012, the new Miami Trolley system inaugurated its first route which passes through Civic Center on its way to Marlins Park.

Education

Colleges and universities
University of Miami – Leonard M. Miller School of Medicine, founded in 1952
Miami Dade College – Medical Center Campus, opened in 1977
Florida International University – Wertheim College of Medicine (teaching hospital at Jackson), opened in 2006

Historic Civic Center

References

Neighborhoods in Miami